Fly So Free (March 3, 1988 – September 21, 2003) was an American Thoroughbred Champion racehorse. A grandson of U.S. Racing Hall of Fame inductee Damascus, he was owned by New York City Broadway theatre producer and music publishing company owner Tommy Valando and his wife Elizabeth.

In 1990, Fly So Free capped off a successful two-year-old racing campaign with a win in the Breeders' Cup Juvenile. Voted 1990's U.S. Champion 2-Yr-Old Colt, he went into the 1991 racing season ranked as a top contender for the U.S. Triple Crown series of races. En route, Fly So Free won the spring 1991 Hutcheson Stakes the Fountain of Youth Stakes and Florida Derby in which he defeated two other top three-year-olds, Strike the Gold and Hansel. A few weeks later, in mid-April's Blue Grass Stakes, Fly So Free finished second to Strike the Gold.

For the 1991 Kentucky Derby, bettors made Fly So Free the second choice to Hansel but both horses disappointed, Fly So Free finishing fifth and Hansel tenth to winner Strike the Gold. Fly So Free was not entered in the 1991 Preakness Stakes or the 1991 Belmont Stakes as trainer Scotty Schulhofer felt he was unable to run longer races. Instead, he competed in and won the Riva Ridge and the Jim Dandy Stakes.

Racing at age four, Fly So Free met with modest success, most notably a second to Strike the Gold in the 1992 Pimlico Special. At age five, near the end of the 1993 racing season, he won the Fall Highweight Handicap at Aqueduct Racetrack, a race in which a horse's ability to carry weight is put to the test. After a 9th-place finish in that year's Breeders' Cup Sprint, Fly So Free was retired to stud duty at Three Chimneys Farm in Midway, Kentucky, where he remained for the rest of his life.

Fly So Free sired five Group/Graded stakes race winners, including the 1999 Canadian Female Turf Horse Champion Free Vacation and the 2001 Dubai World Cup winner, Captain Steve.

In November 2002, Fly So Free was pensioned as a result of cardiac problems. He died of congestive heart failure on September 21, 2003, at Three Chimneys Farm, where he is buried.

Pedigree

References

 Fall Highweight Handicap at the NYRA
 Fly So Free's pedigree and racing stats

1988 racehorse births
2003 racehorse deaths
Racehorses bred in Kentucky
Racehorses trained in the United States
Breeders' Cup Juvenile winners
Eclipse Award winners
Thoroughbred family 27-a